Dent Branch is a stream in Washington County in the U.S. state of Missouri. It is a tributary of the Big River.

A variant name was "Dents Branch". The stream has the name of the local Dent family.

See also
List of rivers of Missouri

References

Rivers of Washington County, Missouri
Rivers of Missouri